Chambeali is a language spoken in the Chamba district of Himachal Pradesh.

Classification 
The Chambeali language is a part of the North-Western branch of the Indo-Aryan languages. It is further classified as a member of the Western-Pahari group. The language has a high degree of mutual intelligibility with neighbouring Pahari languages like Mandeali (83%).

Geographic distribution

Official status 
The language is commonly called Pahari or Himachali. Some speaker may even call it a dialect of Punjabi or Dogri. The language has no official status and is recorded as dialect of Hindi. According to the United Nations Education, Scientific and Cultural Organisation (UNESCO), the language is of definitely endangered category, i.e. many Chambeali children are not learning Chambeali as their mother tongue any longer. Earlier the language got huge amount of state patronage. Everything changed since independence, due to favoritism towards Hindi by the Indian Government. 

The demand for the inclusion of 'Pahari (Himachali)' under the Eight Schedule of the Constitution, which is supposed to represent multiple Pahari languages of Himachal Pradesh, had been made in the year 2010 by the state's Vidhan Sabha. There has been no positive progress on this matter since then even when small organisations are striving to save the language. Due to political interest, the language is currently recorded as a dialect of Hindi, even when having a poor mutual intelligibility with it and having a higher mutual intelligibility with other recognised languages like Dogri.

Dialects 
There are three dialects of the language as follows:

 Bansyari
 Bansbari
 Gadi Chambeali

Writing system 
The native script of the language is Takri script. The Chambeali version of Takri script has been encoded as the standard for Takri script under Unicode. This version resembles other version of the script.

Vocabulary

Name of months 
Traditionally, the month formats is based on Hindu calendar.

References 

Northern Indo-Aryan languages
Languages of Himachal Pradesh
Endangered languages of India